Giselle Cole (born 1961 or 1962 in Trinidad and Tobago) is a Canadian retired Paralympic athlete. She competed at the 1980 Paralympics in Athletics. She was born with birth defects due to thalidomide.

References

Living people
1960s births
Medalists at the 1980 Summer Paralympics
Paralympic gold medalists for Canada
Paralympic medalists in athletics (track and field)
Athletes (track and field) at the 1980 Summer Paralympics
Paralympic track and field athletes of Canada
Canadian female sprinters
Canadian female long jumpers
Sprinters with limb difference
Long jumpers with limb difference
Paralympic sprinters
Paralympic long jumpers